The Symphony No. 1 is a four-movement orchestral composition by the Finnish composer Uuno Klami, who wrote the piece from 1937 to 1938. Georg Schnéevoigt and the Helsinki Philharmonic Orchestra premiered the work on 5 May 1939; later that year, Klami enlisted in the Finnish military and fought against the Soviet Union in the Winter War.

Although the Symphony No. 1 is the first of Klami's two numbered symphonies, it was preceded by the Symphonie enfantine (Children's Symphony), Op. 17, a 1928 composition for chamber orchestra.

Orchestration 
The First Symphony is scored for the following instruments:
Woodwind: piccolo, 3 flutes, 2 oboes, 2 clarinets, and 2 bassoons
Brass: 4 horns, 3 trumpets, 3 trombones, and tuba
Percussion: timpani, bass drum, snare drum, and cymbals
Strings: violins, violas, cellos, and double basses

Structure 

The First Symphony is in four movements. They are as follows:

Discography 
The sortable table below lists the only commercially available recording of the First Symphony:

References and sources

References

Sources 

 

Compositions by Uuno Klami
1938 compositions
20th-century symphonies